The office of the President of Tianjin University, currently held by Jin Donghan, was created with the founding of Tientsin University in 1895 as the governor officer of the school.

After the founding of the People's Republic of China, each president is appointed by and is responsible to the Central Committee of the Chinese Communist Party and the State Council, who is delegated the day-to-day running of the university. In reality, the university President reports to the Party Secretary in the university's Communist Party committee.

Presidents of Tianjin University

Communist Party Committee Secretaries of Tianjin University

References

External links
 

Tianjin University
Tianjin University
Academic staff of Tianjin University